The  Warm Springs Wilderness makes up the entirety of the Black Mesa (western Arizona) and parts of the surrounding foothills, washes, alluvial fans, and valleys. The Black Mesa is the southernmost section of the Black Mountains of western Mohave County, in northwest Arizona. The region is in the east and southeast of the Mojave Desert of Arizona, southern Nevada, and California.

Oatman, AZ lies on its northwest perimeter, adjacent to the Boundary Cone landmark; Yucca, AZ is on its east in the south-central Sacramento Valley on Interstate 40 in Arizona which traverses due-south from Kingman, then turns due west of the Black Mesa and Warm Springs Wilderness perimeter to meet Needles, California, on the Colorado River.

The wilderness is one of the many wilderness areas located in the Lower Colorado River Valley. The Mount Nutt Wilderness is adjacent north across Sitgreaves Pass, just east of Oatman.

Description

The wilderness has volcanic plugs to the north in the Mount Nutt Wilderness. One example offset on the Warm Springs border northwest, 4 mi south of Oatman, Arizona is Boundary Cone, a major landmark in Mohave Valley's northeast.

The various springs located on the mesa's perimeter are highest in water volume following wet winters, or periods of high summer monsoonal weather.

Flora and fauna
One of the major fauna elements is the Desert Bighorn Sheep.

See also
List of U.S. Wilderness Areas
List of Arizona Wilderness Areas
Wilderness Act
Black Mountains (Arizona)
Boundary Cone
Mohave & Sacramento Valleys

References

External links
BLM
Warm Springs Wilderness at Bureau of Land Management

Trails
Arizona Trails West Region, (coordinates)

Warm Springs at wilderness.net
area map; Warm Springs at Public Lands
Mount Nutt Wilderness, BLM

Protected areas of Mohave County, Arizona
Wilderness areas within the Lower Colorado River Valley
Wilderness areas of Arizona
IUCN Category Ib
Bureau of Land Management areas in Arizona
Protected areas established in 1990
1990 establishments in Arizona